Tanya Dennis  (born 26 August 1985) is a Canadian women's international footballer who plays as a defender. She is a member of the Canada women's national soccer team. She was part of the team at the 2003 FIFA Women's World Cup and 2007 FIFA Women's World Cup. At college level she played for Nebraska Cornhuskers in the United States. At club level, she played for the Toronto Lady Lynx and Ottawa Fury.

References

External links
 

1985 births
Living people
Canadian women's soccer players
Canada women's international soccer players
Place of birth missing (living people)
2007 FIFA Women's World Cup players
Women's association football defenders
Expatriate women's soccer players in the United States
Footballers at the 2003 Pan American Games
Nebraska Cornhuskers women's soccer players
Canadian expatriate sportspeople in the United States
Canadian expatriate soccer players
Black Canadian women's soccer players
Soccer people from Ontario
2003 FIFA Women's World Cup players
Pan American Games competitors for Canada
Toronto Lady Lynx players
Ottawa Fury (women) players
USL W-League (1995–2015) players